Hillcrest is a town in the KwaZulu-Natal province of South Africa. Organisationally and administratively it is included in the eThekwini Metropolitan Municipality as a suburb of the Outer West region.

History
Hillcrest was formerly a sleepy village, governed by its own Town Board on the outskirts of Durban that has now become a booming suburb incorporated into the eThekwini Metropolitan Municipality. Hill Crest (as the town's name was variously spelt until 1969) was founded on a rise in the main road from Durban to Pietermaritzburg in 1895 as a farming or "weekend" village, then a good distance from what was the emerging port of Port Natal. The village was laid out as leasehold sites on a portion of the farm Albinia owned by William Gillitt, one of the main pioneer families of the area and after which the nearby suburb of Gillitts is named.

One of the other early families to set up in the area was the Acutts who had already established the well known in Durban estate agents firm of that name. In 1903 the first school in the village was established in a wood and iron cottage in Hospital Road leased to a Mrs McMillian, the principal of the first Highbury School, by Horace Acutt.

When the first Hillcrest Health Committee was established in 1943, the total all-race population was 1135 persons and only the Main Road was hardened. Nkutu Road was hardened with klinker in 1947 and this was followed in 1951 with the hardening of the first portion of Inanda Road. In 1962 blacktopping of selected roads in the central area began, followed by further roads in 1965. By 1971, when Town Board status was obtained, the total population had grown to 2799 persons.

The Hillcrest Waste Water Treatment Plant was established in the 1990s, then serving only the central commercial area of the village with phased extensions planned in time, with other areas continuing on septic tanks.

Hillcrest Today
Hillcrest lost its independent Town Board status in 1996 and was made subject to administration by the Outer West Local Council - a substructure council of the then Durban Unicity. In 2000, the Outer West Local Council, along with other local councils, was disestablished and were replaced by the single eThekwini Municipality encompassing the entire Durban metropolitan area.

The suburb of Hillcrest experienced a building boom in the late 1990s and 2000s with the construction of many gated communities and shopping centres.

Geography
Hillcrest is located on a hilly region above Gillitts and Everton to the east and below Botha’s Hill to the west approximately 18 km north-west of Pinetown by road, 32 km north-west of Durban by road and 53 km south-east of Pietermaritzburg by road. 

Due to the growth of Hillcrest and its neighbouring towns, it has now become a de facto urban unit with Gillitts, Everton, Waterfall and Kloof known as the Upper Highway Area, as it is located on the M13 highway above Pinetown. It borders the rural area of Embo to the north, Waterfall to the north-east, Gillitts and Everton to the east and the villages of Assagay and Botha's Hill to the west.

Suburban areas 

 Albany
 Albina
 Belvedere 
 Belvedere Ext 1
 Cotswold Downs Golf and Country Estate 
 Hilldene
 Plantations
 West Riding

Healthcare 
Hillcrest encompasses two hospitals, Hillcrest Hospital, a public hospital south of the town centre and the Busamed Hillcrest Private Hospital, a private hospital owned by major South African hospital group, Busamed, in the neighbouring village of Assagay.

Transport

Roads
Hillcrest has access to two major highways, the M13 and the N3 and one regional road, the R103.

The M13 King Cetshwayo Highway is the main highway that traverses past Hillcrest. The highway bypasses Hillcrest to the south and links Hillcrest to the neighbouring suburbs of Gillitts and Kloof to the east and further south-east to Pinetown, Westville and Durban and to the N3 highway (to Pietermaritzburg) to the west. Access to the M13 from Hillcrest can be obtained through the Old Main Road off-ramp (Exit 28), Shongweni Road off-ramp (Exit 31) and the Kassier Road off-ramp (Exit 33).

The M13 acts as an alternative route to the tolled N3 highway for motorists heading south-east towards Pinetown and Durban. 

The N3 highway is a toll highway that bypasses Hillcrest further south than the M13 therefore it has more of an indirect linkage to Hillcrest than the M13. The N3 links to Pietermaritzburg in the north-west and Pinetown and Durban in the south-east. Access to the N3 from Hillcrest can be obtained through Kassier Road. 

The R103 links Hillcrest to Ladysmith in the north-west via Botha's Hill, Inchanga, Cato Ridge, Camperdown, Pietermaritzburg, Howick, Mooi River, Estcourt and Colenso. The R103 is the original N3 and served the same function before the construction of the highway. Similarly to the current N3, the R103 was the main road between Durban and Pietermaritzburg and thus the name of the road being Old Main Road.

Other than the M13, Hillcrest has access to other metropolitan routes in the eThekwini metropolitan area including the M33 Inanda Road linking Hillcrest to Waterfall in the north-east and Kloof in the east and M46 Kassier Road linking Hillcrest to Assagay in the west and Shongweni and Mpumalanga in the south-west.

Schools
A public school system is provided in Hillcrest including Hillcrest High School and Hillcrest Primary School, with Winston Park Primary School in nearby Winston Park.

Private schools include Highbury Preparatory School, Curro: HCA and Waterfall Schools with Kearsney College and the Roseway Waldorf School in nearby Botha's Hill and Alverstone respectively.

Notable residents
Dale Benkenstein, Nashua Dolphins cricket player
Wayne Fyvie, former Sharks and SA national rugby player
Ian McIntosh, former Rhodesian, Sharks and SA national rugby coach
Shaun Pollock, former Dolphins and SA national cricket player and captain
Terence Parkin, Olympic medalist
Heather Hamilton, Miss South Africa 1999, Miss Universe top 10 1999, Miss World contestant 2000
Megan Coleman, Miss South Africa 2006, Miss Universe 2007, Miss World contestant 2007
Harold 'Tiger' Wright, South African Champion Jockey
Sir Liege Hulett, Founder of Kearsney College, founder of Hulett's Sugar.
Horace Smethurst, Springbok Soccer Captain, Australia New Zealand Tour 1947, soccer player

References

Sources
Lest We Forget - The Story of Hillcrest 1895 - 1995, Elizabeth Camp, 
Hillcrest Gillitts Activity Corridor Local Development Plan - Outer West Local Council, 2000
The Highway Mail, 1 June 2011.
The Hilltop, 2 June 2011.
Independent Electoral Commission (South Africa), 9 June 2011.

Populated places in eThekwini Metropolitan Municipality
Populated places established in 1896